Juris Vovčoks (born 16 January 1972) is a Latvian luger. He competed at the 1994 Winter Olympics and the 1998 Winter Olympics.

References

1972 births
Living people
Latvian male lugers
Olympic lugers of Latvia
Lugers at the 1994 Winter Olympics
Lugers at the 1998 Winter Olympics
People from Bauska